Karadagly (Qaradağlı) is a rural locality (a selo) in Tatlyarsky Selsoviet, Derbentsky District, Republic of Dagestan, Russia. The population was 788 as of 2010. There are 12 streets.

Geography 
Karadagly is located 28 km northwest of Derbent (the district's administrative centre) by road. Tatlyar and Padar are the nearest rural localities.

Nationalities 
Azerbaijanis live there.

References 

Rural localities in Derbentsky District